The Baltimore County Sheriff's Office (BCoSO) is the enforcement arm of the Baltimore County, Maryland court and is headquartered in the Baltimore County Courthouse, in the County Seat of  Towson, Maryland. The Baltimore County Sheriff's Office is one of the oldest sheriff's offices in existence in the State of Maryland, dating back to 1659, the traditional year of the County's "erection" (founding).

Patch Description
The agency's uniform shoulder patch depicts two Maryland Militiamen, who also happened to be  Baltimore County Deputy Sheriffs, who were killed, during the British land and sea attack at the Battle of North Point on September 12, 1814, in the War of 1812 (later celebrated as a state, county, and city holiday as "Defenders' Day" - simultaneous with the bombardment of Fort McHenry from the Patapsco River on September 13-14th, and the inspiration for the writing of the National Anthem, "The Star-Spangled Banner" by Francis Scott Key, 1779-1843). Daniel Wells and Henry McComas have historically been given credit for shooting and killing the commanding British General Robert Ross and were later both killed in the following skirmish and battle. A memorial known as the "Wells-McComas Monument" to the two fallen Militia Soldiers/Deputies is located on North Gay Street by the intersecting Aisquith and Orleans Streets in "Ashland Square" in East Baltimore City, where they were buried beneath after being exhumed in the 1870s from their original grave site and moved with great ceremony and publicity to Ashland Square.  A smaller memorial where the two Deputies/Militiamen and nearby General Ross were killed is located on Old Battle Grove Road in Dundalk near "Battle Acre", the small, one-acre park donated to the State on the 25th Anniversary of Defenders' Day, in 1839 marking the center of the North Point Battlefield off Old North Point Road, its later parallel by-pass - North Point Boulevard at the intersection with German Hill Road, from September 12, 1814. Here to celebrate the extensive week-long "Star-Spangled Banner Centennial Anniversary" in 1914, the historic site was surrounded by an decorative cast-iron fence and a large stone base with a bronze cannon surmounting it and with a historical bronze plaque mounted on the side. Large stone-base signs with historical markers visible to passing traffic noting the "Battle of North Point" and "War of 1812" sites were also erected north and south of the historic battlefield area in the median strip of the 1977-era Baltimore Beltway, (Interstate 695) by the Maryland Department of Transportation's State Highway Administration that were placed through the efforts finally in 2004 of various local historical preservation-minded citizens and the Dundalk-Patapsco Neck Historical Society. An attempt to at least mark the general area of the historic battlefield site despite the high-speed highway routed through its fields along with the surrounding intensive post-World War II commercial and residential development unthinkingly constructed around the narrow peninsula field between Bread and Cheese Creek off Back River to the north and Bear Creek leading to the Patapsco to the south.

Organization
As of 2008, the BCSO is headed by R. Jay Fisher, Sheriff of Baltimore County. The BCSO currently has an authorized complement of 70 sworn deputies. The rank structure is as follows:
Sheriff (1)
Undersheriff (1)
Captain (1)
Lieutenant (2)
Sergeant (6)
Deputy & Deputy First Class (60)

The BCoSO is subdivided into five sections as follows:
Courtroom Security Bureau and Transportation Division - responsible for transport and temporary housing of defendants to and from the Circuit Court, and other detention facilities.
Field Operations Bureau - Legal Process Division; is responsible for the service of court-ordered processes such as Writs of Execution, Writs of Summons/Subpoenas, Writs of Possession (evictions), Ex Parte/Protective/Peace Orders, and service of Criminal/Juvenile/Civil Warrants.
Field Operations Bureau - Warrant Unit; has the responsibility of non-support warrant service.
Administrative Services Division - is responsible for the day-to-day operations of the BCoSO
Security Division - is responsible for the constant security of the courthouse and surrounding property and is staffed by both sworn deputies and non-sworn security personnel.

Authority
The authority of the Sheriff and all sworn deputies are constitutional in origin. All are certified police officers with full arrest authority under guidelines of the Maryland Police and Correctional Training Commission and the Constitution of the State of Maryland.

See also

 List of law enforcement agencies in Maryland

References

External links
Baltimore County Sheriff's Office official homepage

Baltimore County, Maryland
Sheriffs' offices of Maryland
1659 establishments in Maryland